Joseph Franz may refer to:

 Archduke Joseph Franz of Austria (1799–1807), second son and seventh child of Francis II
 Joseph Franz, Prince of Dietrichstein (1798–1858), German prince
 Joseph Franz (director) (1883–1970), American actor and film director

See also
 Franz Joseph (disambiguation)